Penthouse TV is an American premium adult entertainment television channel consisting of explicit adult material, primarily hardcore pornographic films and mainstream interviews. The channel's name is licensed from the men's magazine Penthouse. The channel is owned by Penthouse Media and distributed by New Frontier Media's The Erotic Network. Launched in December 2007, it was originally available only as a pay-per-view channel and video on demand service, but since mid-2011 it has been available as an a la carte monthly service, along with a high definition channel (an attempt at a 3DTV version of the network was eventually abandoned with the non-adoption of the technology).

Slogans
 Adult Entertainment, Redefined
 A Higher Standard For Hardcore

See also
Penthouse TV (Canada)

References

Penthouse (magazine)
American pornographic television channels
Television channels and stations established in 2007
3D television channels
Nudity in television
Television pornography